Jackson Earle Gilliam (June 20, 1920 – October 19, 2000) was bishop of the Episcopal Diocese of Montana, serving from 1968 to 1985.

Early years and Education
Gilliam was born on June 20, 1920 in Heppner, Oregon, to Edwin Earle Gilliam and Mary Elizabeth Perry. He attended Whitman College where he graduated with honors in 1942. After serving in the United States Army from 1942 to 1946, he attended the Episcopal Theological Seminary in Alexandria, Virginia. He graduated with a Bachelor of Divinity degree in 1948. He then did further study and received a Master of Sacred Theology degree the following year.

Ordination and Ministry
He was ordained to deacon on Jun 10, 1948 by William Remington, Suffragan Bishop of Pennsylvania in St Mary's Church in Arlington, Virginia. After his ordination to the priesthood in July 1949, he served as rector of St John's Church in Hermiston, Oregon till 1953, when he became a canon of the Cathedral chapter of St Mark's Cathedral in Minneapolis. In 1955, he became rector of the Church of the Incarnation in Great Falls, Montana, a position he has held till 1968.

Bishop
In 1968, Gilliam was elected Bishop of Montana. He was consecrated on September 16, 1968 in the Roman Catholic Cathedral of St. Helena, Helena, Montana by John E. Hines, Presiding Bishop of the US Episcopal Church. The co-consecrators were Chandler Sterling, former Bishop of Montana and George M. Murray, Coadjutor Bishop of Alabama. He retired in 1985.

Personal life
He was married to Margaret Kathleen Hindley on August 11, 1943, and they had three children.

References

Diocesan Journal
Consecration of Bishop Gilliam

1920 births
2000 deaths
People from Heppner, Oregon
Whitman College alumni
Episcopal Divinity School alumni
20th-century American Episcopalians
Episcopal bishops of Montana
20th-century American clergy